Linn Torp (born 22 April 1977) is a Norwegian cyclist. She was born in Eidsvoll. She won the Norwegian National Road Race Championship in 2006 and 2009.

She competed at the 2004 Summer Olympics in Athens, and at the 2006 UCI Road World Championships.

See also
 2009 Lotto-Belisol Ladiesteam season

References

External links
 

1977 births
Cyclists at the 2004 Summer Olympics
Living people
Norwegian female cyclists
Olympic cyclists of Norway
People from Eidsvoll
Sportspeople from Viken (county)
21st-century Norwegian women